In the United Kingdom, a seasonworker (also called a holiday rep or a saisonaire) is a person who spends either their summers or winters working abroad for a tour operator.

Overview 
A seasonworker can spend up to eight months abroad; as a result, the job is often filled by those on a gap year, students, or those looking for a career break.  The jobs are usually low-paid, but accommodation is generally included, as are perks such as ski passes for winter seasons. Seasonworkers usually benefit from much free time, discounts around the resort at which they are based, and the chance to learn about new cultures. Among the activities a seasonworker might be involved in providing are kids club daycare, a dance party, a pool party, and general party planning such as hosting nightlife events, cabaret and nightclub acts, singles events, yoga classes, aerobics classes, and other outdoor activities.

Due to the holiday-like conditions they live in, seasonworkers can have a reputation for being rowdy and irresponsible and encouraging acts such as binge-drinking, an image largely promoted by British television programmes such as Ibiza Uncovered, Ibiza Weekender, and Club Reps. This led to a backlash against many "Brits abroad" holidays by the police and other authorities.

Seasonworkers who work for family camping companies such as Canvas Holidays, Eurocamp, Camping Life, and Keycamp may be somewhat unhappy being associated with the word "rep" and so go by the traditional title of "courier". Being a seasonworker can be enjoyable but there are times when hard work is required, usually on changeover days when everything needs to be cleaned. Also, on many campsites, owners insist that "live tents" are generally situated in the worst location i.e. next to rubbish containers or cesspits.

Camping seasonworkers will generally have to wear brightly coloured uniforms consisting of shorts, T-shirts, tracksuit bottoms, fleeces, and caps. The colours of the uniforms reflect each company's unique branding.

Some seasonal work, such as sailing and jetskiing instruction, requires staff to attain a qualification.

References 

Labour in the United Kingdom
Employment classifications
Hospitality occupations
People in tourism
Precarious work
Sports coaches
Temporary employment agencies
Temporary employment
Yoga teachers